The ministries of the Northern Territory are appointed by the Chief Minister of the Northern Territory each term from the members of the Northern Territory Legislative Assembly.

See also
 Members of the Northern Territory Legislative Assembly
 List of Northern Territory by-elections

References